Steven Alexander Penney (born 6 January 1964) is a former Northern Ireland international footballer who played as a right winger.

Penney started his career with hometown Ballymena United, before moving to England with Brighton & Hove Albion in 1983. Penney spent 8 seasons playing for Brighton in the second and third tier of English football before a single season cameo with Heart of Midlothian in 1991–92. After a similarly short spell with Burnley, a serious knee injury forced him into early retirement.

He was capped 17 times by Northern Ireland, earning selection for the 1986 World Cup squad in Mexico.

References

External links 
 
 London Hearts profile
 Northern Ireland Footballing Greats profile

1964 births
Living people
Sportspeople from Ballymena
Association football wingers
Northern Ireland international footballers
Association footballers from Northern Ireland
Linfield F.C. players
Ballymena United F.C. players
Brighton & Hove Albion F.C. players
Heart of Midlothian F.C. players
Burnley F.C. players
1986 FIFA World Cup players
English Football League players
Scottish Football League players
NIFL Premiership players